Gyrodactylus branchialis is a species of monogenean ectoparasites. It was found in Pomatoschistus microps in European coastal waters.

See also 
 Gyrodactylus gondae
 Gyrodactylus flavescensis
 Gyrodactylus arcuatoides

References 

Animal parasites of fish
Gyrodactylus
Animals described in 2004